Legend of the Demigods is a TVB fantasy-adventure TV series starring Linda Chung, Benny Chan and Sunny Chan as the main lead, with Halina Tam, Stephen Au, Nancy Wu and Charmaine Li as the main supporting cast. The ending theme song Fat Sai is performed by Linda Chung and can be found in the Lady in Red album. It was produced in 2007 and first broadcast in August 2008.

Plot
Gai Choi-Chi is no different from an ordinary girl, except that Lady Luck seems to smile upon her and keep her out of trouble all the time. She is thus nicknamed "Ho-Choi Mui" ("Lucky Girl"). However, she does not know that her stepmother, called Ho-Choi Ma, is actually a plant spirit. Choi-Chi helps some deities defeat an evil spirit once and her stepmother turns her into a demigod to save her life.

As a child, Shek Kam-Dong was constantly bullied and looked down upon, but he still remains filial to his mother and shows great respect for the gods. Wong Tai Sin, a wish-granting god, takes pity on Shek and grants him superhuman strength. However, Shek starts to abuse his new power and uses it to bully others, becoming a local tyrant in town.

An Hei has narcolepsy, as he is always tired and falls asleep at random timings. Wong Tai-Sin tries to help An Hei by presenting him a magical sword that is possessed by the spirit of a warrior. Whenever An Hei runs into trouble, the powerful spirit will possess him and help him defeat his enemies.

One day, an evil wizard disturbs the quiet town and captures Ho-Choi Ma. Gai Choi-Chi, Shek Kam-Dong and An Hei joins hands to confront the wizard and defeat her to save Ho-Choi Ma. They travel across the continent on their heroic quest, encountering strange and mystical events along the journey.

Cast

Viewership ratings

Award nominations
41st TVB Anniversary Awards (2008)
"Best Drama"
"My Favourite Male Character" (Sunny Chan - An Hei) (Top 15)
"My Favourite Female Character" (Linda Chung - Gwai Choi-Chi) (Top 5)

References

External links
TVB.com Legend of the Demigods - Official Website 
K for TVB.net Legend of the Demigods - Episodic Synopsis and Screen Captures 

TVB dramas
2008 Hong Kong television series debuts
2008 Hong Kong television series endings